Working in Tennessee is the sixty-third and final solo studio album by American country music artist Merle Haggard. It was released on October 4, 2011 by Vanguard Records. This is also the second Merle Haggard album released by Vanguard.

Critical reception

Stephen Thomas Erlewine of Allmusic praised the album, writing "Hag never rushes things, never turns up the volume, his western swing now bearing a closer resemblance to the gentlemanly amiability of Hank Thompson instead of the wild, woolly Bob Wills. He’s proceeding at the pace of a 74-year-old legend with nothing to prove, yet he’s not resting on his laurels, he’s just doing what he’s always done: singing songs so expertly his virtuosity almost goes unnoticed." In his review, music critic Robert Christgau only wrote "Now 74 and short half a lung, he's not making the best music of his life, just the best albums... Man's learned how to live, and he has no intention of stopping." Spin writes of the style, "His greatest skill remains how convincingly he stands in, and stands up, for regular guys, even when he's coasting... Working in Tennessee glides along on its Bakersfield groove with the greatest of ease, despite the album's title."

Track listing

Personnel
Merle Haggard – vocals, guitar
Biff Adam – drums
Don Markham – saxophone
Red Lane – guitar
Willie Nelson – vocals, guitar
Ben Haggard – vocals, guitar
Gene Chrisman – drums
George Receli – drums, percussion
Doug Colosio – keyboards, piano
Theresa Haggard – background vocals
David Hood – bass
Kevin Williams – bass
Tim Howard – drums, guitar
Rob Ickes – Dobro, pedal steel guitar, slide guitar
Jeff Ingraham – drums
Scott Joss – banjo, fiddle, guitar, background vocals
Reggie Young – guitar
Joe Manuel – dobro
Bobby Wood – piano

Chart performance

References

2011 albums
Merle Haggard albums
Vanguard Records albums